The 2016 Asian Taekwondo Championships were the 22nd edition of the Asian Taekwondo Championships, and was scheduled from April 18 to 20, 2016 at the Marriott Convention Center Grand Ballroom in Pasay, Metro Manila, Philippines.

Medal summary

Men

Women

Medal table

Team ranking

Men

Women

References

External links
1st Day Results
2nd Day Results
3rd Day Results

Asian Championships
Asian Taekwondo Championships
Asian Taekwondo Championships
Asian Taekwondo Championships, 2016